Travo is a comune (municipality) in the Province of Piacenza in the Italian region Emilia-Romagna, located about  northwest of Bologna and about  southwest of Piacenza.  It is on the left bank of the Trebbia river.

Geography
Travo borders the following municipalities: Alta Val Tidone, Bettola, Bobbio, Coli, Gazzola, Piozzano, Rivergaro and Vigolzone.

References

External links

 Official website
 Travo on The Campanile Project

Cities and towns in Emilia-Romagna